Andrew R. Liddle  (born 9 June 1965) is Professor of astrophysics at the Royal Observatory Edinburgh. Publications include books and over 260 papers. He is a theoretical cosmologist and is interested in understanding the properties of the Universe and how these relate to fundamental physical laws.

Research
Liddle's research is on various aspects of cosmology and astrophysics, and in particular he is interested in the origin and evolution of structure in the Universe, with special focus on models and observational constraints on the inflationary cosmology, physics of the cosmic microwave background and the use of galaxy clusters as cosmological probes.

His areas of research include:
 The origin and evolution of structure in the Universe
 Models of and observational constraints on the inflationary cosmology
 Physics of the cosmic microwave background
 Dark energy in the Universe.

He is involved in several international projects, including the Planck satellite, the Dark Energy Survey and the XMM Cluster Survey.

Before his position at the Royal Observatory Edinburgh he was a professor of cosmology at University of Sussex in Brighton.

Publications
 An Introduction to Modern Cosmology, 2nd edition  (pbk), 0-470-84834-0 (hbk),
 Cosmological Inflation and Large Scale Structure,  (pbk), 0-521-66022-X (hbk),
 The Oxford Companion to Cosmology,  (pbk),
 The Primordial Density Perturbation,  (pbk), 978-0-521-82849-9 (hbk),
 Bayesian Methods in Cosmology,  (hbk).

Awards and honors
In 2015, Liddle was elected a Fellow of the Royal Society of Edinburgh.

References

External links

 Liddle's personal web page
 Liddle's articles on arXiv
 Liddle's theme tree on arxiv.org
 Liddle's papers relevant to high energy physics

1965 births
Living people
British physicists
21st-century British astronomers